Her Royal Majesty's Records (HRMR) is a Canadian independent record label founded in Vancouver in 1995 by Bif Naked and Peter Karroll and managed by Peter Karroll.  Originally HRM Records was created to be a home for Bif Naked's music after Plum Records folded up shop after the release of Bif Naked's self-titled release.  Peter Karroll licensed Bif's songs to many major labels and did co-venture music projects including mixing and recording tracks for Films and Television.   Peter Karroll co-wrote, produced and mixed many successful tracks including Platinum and Gold selling albums and singles with Bif Naked.  In 2005 Peter Karroll merged the music label with Bodog to create Bodog Music and Bodog Entertainment.  Her Royal Majesty's Records was the backbone of the Bodog entertainment juggernaut and combined with the Artist Management company TKO Entertainment Corp the Bodog Entertainment entity produced over 150 Network Television shows in the US and licensed in many countries.  As well live events on In Demand and music television programing on the Fuse Network all contributed to the overall success of Bodog Entertainment.  In 2008 the entertainment companies were unmerged and Peter Karroll moved forward more albums with Bif Naked and DMX the American rap / hip hop superstar.  During the Bodog Era Peter signed and released the Legendary Hip Hop group the WuTang Clan.  Thousands of Live events were produced with the Artists from HRMR / Bodog with them touring extensively on major festivals and tours such as Warped Tour, Family Values, Rock Am Ring, Rock Am Park, Hultsfred Festival   Bif Naked's largest attendance in the headline position was 2011 in Cloverdale BC where she performed in front of 110,000 estimated audience.

It has released albums via Worldwide Distribution deals with EMI's Distribution network, Atlantic Records and Sony Music.

Artist roster
Bif Naked Alternative / Rock / Acoustic/ Platinum & Gold selling
Britt Black Alternative / Rock
Dead Celebrity Status Rap / Hip Hop
The Heck - Rock
Hydro and Syndicate Villain / Rap / Hip Hop
LiveonRelease / Punk / Pop
Nazanin  / Pop / World
Wu-Tang Clan / Hip Hop - Multi-Platinum 
Out of Your Mouth  / Hard Rock / Heavy Metal
Soma City Ward - Hard Rock
Todd Kerns - Rock
The Vincent Black Shadow  Alternative 
Fresh Bread - Hip Hop
Gabezra And...The Way Out - Eclectic - Acoustic Electric
Jaydee Bixby - Country Music
Mr. Crippin (Chris Crippin)
DMX   RAP - Hip Hop Multi-Platinum

See also 
 List of record labels

References 

Canadian independent record labels
Alternative rock record labels